Presidents' Day, officially Washington's Birthday at the federal governmental level, is a holiday in the United States celebrated on the third Monday of February. It is often celebrated to honor all those who served as presidents of the United States and, since 1879, has been the federal holiday honoring Founding Father George Washington, who led the Continental Army to victory in the American Revolutionary War, presided at the Constitutional Convention of 1787, and was the first U.S. president.

The day is an official state holiday in most states, with names including Washington's Birthday, Presidents' Day, President's Day, Presidents Day, and Washington's and Lincoln's Birthday. The various states use 15 different names. Depending upon the specific law, the state holiday may officially celebrate Washington alone, Washington and Abraham Lincoln, or some other combination of U.S. presidents (such as Washington and Thomas Jefferson, who was born in April).

Washington's Birthday was celebrated on February 22 from 1879 until 1970. To give federal employees a three-day weekend, in 1968 the Uniform Monday Holiday Act moved it to the third Monday in February, which can occur from February 15 to the 21st. The day soon became known as Presidents(') Day (the placement of the apostrophe, if any, varies) and provides an occasion to remember all U.S. presidents, to honor Abraham Lincoln's and Washington's birthdays together, or any single president of choice.

As many states and cities followed suit, some states that had been celebrating Lincoln's birthday on February 12 combined the two into Presidents Day. Lincoln led the nation through the American Civil War, preserved the Union, abolished slavery, bolstered the federal government, and modernized the U.S. economy.

Official state holidays

Lincoln's Birthday, February 12, was never a federal holiday, but nearly half the state governments have officially renamed their observances "Presidents' Day", "Washington and Lincoln Day", or other such designations. (In historical rankings of presidents of the United States, Lincoln and Washington are usually the top two.)

In the following states and territories of the United States, this same day is an official state holiday and known as—

Using "President" in the official title:
"Presidents' Day" in Hawaii, New Mexico, North Dakota, Oklahoma, Pennsylvania, Puerto Rico, South Dakota, Texas, Vermont, and Washington
"President's Day" in Alaska, Idaho, Maryland, Nebraska, New Hampshire, Tennessee, West Virginia, and Wyoming
"Presidents Day" in Nevada and Oregon
"Washington's Birthday/President's Day" in Maine
"Lincoln/Washington Presidents' Day" in Arizona

Using "Washington" alone:
"George Washington Day" in Virginia
"Washington's Birthday" in Connecticut, Florida, Illinois, Iowa, Louisiana, Massachusetts, Michigan, North Carolina, New Jersey, and New York

Using both "Washington" and "Lincoln":
"Lincoln's and Washington's Birthday" in Montana
"Washington–Lincoln Day" in Colorado, Ohio
"Washington and Lincoln Day" in Utah
"Washington's and Lincoln's Birthday" in Minnesota

Using "Washington" and another person:
"George Washington/Thomas Jefferson Birthday" in Alabama
"George Washington's Birthday and Daisy Bates Day" in Arkansas

Using something else:
"The third Monday in February" generic term used in California

Not a holiday:
Some states do not officially observe the holiday on this day and do not have a day celebrating Washington or presidents in general. Delaware does not observe the Washington's Birthday federal holiday.

Several states honor presidents with official state holidays that do not fall on the third Monday of February. In Massachusetts, the state officially celebrates "Washington's Birthday" on the same day as the federal holiday. State law also directs the governor to issue an annual "Presidents Day" proclamation on May 29 (John F. Kennedy's birthday), honoring the presidents with Massachusetts roots: Kennedy, John Adams, John Quincy Adams, and Calvin Coolidge. In California, Connecticut, Florida, Illinois, Michigan, and New Jersey, Lincoln's Birthday is a separate state holiday celebrated on February 12. In Missouri, Washington's Birthday is a federal holiday, observed on the third Monday in February, and Abraham Lincoln's birthday is observed on the Monday closest to February 12 (always the Monday preceding Washington's Birthday).

In New Mexico, Presidents' Day, at least as a state-government paid holiday, is observed on the Friday following Thanksgiving, although the legal public holiday remains the third Monday in February. In Georgia, Washington's Birthday is not a state-government paid holiday, although until 2018 it was officially observed on Christmas Eve. Similarly, in Indiana, Washington's Birthday is observed on Christmas Eve, or the day preceding the weekend if Christmas falls on Saturday or Sunday, while Lincoln's Birthday is the day after Thanksgiving.

History 

George Washington was born on February 11, 1731 (O.S.), at his parents' Pope's Creek Estate near Colonial Beach in Westmoreland County, Virginia, now the George Washington Birthplace National Monument. At the time, the entire British Empire, including its North American possessions, was on the Julian calendar; the Empire, not being bound to the Catholic Church, had not yet adopted the modern Gregorian calendar that Catholic countries had adopted in 1582. Consequently, by the 1730s, the Julian calendar used by Britain and the Colonies was eleven days behind the Gregorian, because of leap year differences. Furthermore, the British civil year began on March 25 rather than January 1, so that dates in February (such as this one) 'belonged' to the preceding year. (See Dual dating). In 1752, The British Empire switched to the Gregorian calendar; since then, Americans born prior to 1752, including Washington, have typically had their birthdays recognized according to the Gregorian calendar ("New Style" dates). Since February 11, 1731, on the Julian calendar was February 22, 1732, on the Gregorian, and he was alive at the time the change was made, Washington changed his birth date to February 22, 1732, to match the new calendar.

The federal holiday honoring Washington was originally implemented by an Act of Congress in 1879 for government offices in Washington and expanded in 1885 to include all federal offices. As the first federal holiday to honor an American president, the holiday was celebrated on Washington's birthday under the Gregorian calendar, February 22. On January 1, 1971, the federal holiday was shifted to the third Monday in February by the Uniform Monday Holiday Act. This places it between February 15 and 21, which makes "Washington's Birthday" something of a misnomer, since it never occurs on Washington's actual birthday, February 22. (A rough analogue of this phenomenon can be seen in Commonwealth realms, where the reigning monarch's official birthday is celebrated without regard to the monarch's actual date of birth.)

The first attempt to create a Presidents Day occurred in 1951 when the "President's Day National Committee" was formed by Harold Stonebridge Fischer of Compton, California, who became its National Executive Director for the next two decades. The purpose was not to honor any particular president but to honor the office of the presidency. It was first thought that March 4, the original inauguration day, should be deemed Presidents Day, but the bill recognizing March 4 stalled in the Senate Judiciary Committee (which had authority over federal holidays). The committee felt that, given its proximity to Lincoln's and Washington's Birthdays, three holidays so close together would be unduly burdensome. But meanwhile the governors of a majority of the states issued proclamations declaring March 4 Presidents' Day in their respective jurisdictions.

An early draft of the Uniform Monday Holiday Act would have renamed the holiday "Presidents' Day" to honor the birthdays of both Washington and Lincoln, which would explain why the chosen date falls between the two, but this proposal failed in committee, and the bill was voted on and signed into law on June 28, 1968, keeping the name "Washington's Birthday".

By the mid-1980s, with a push from advertisers, the term "Presidents' Day" began its public appearance.

In Washington's adopted hometown of Alexandria, Virginia, celebrations are held throughout February.

Observance and traditions 

A food traditionally associated with the holiday is cherry pie, based on the legend of Washington in his youth chopping down a cherry tree.

Until the late 1980s, corporate businesses generally closed on this day, similar to present corporate practices on Memorial Day or Christmas Day. However, after having been moved to the third Monday, most businesses remain open with many offering sales and other promotions. Federal and state government services close (U.S. Postal Service, state Departments of Motor Vehicles, federal and state courts). Class schedules at universities and colleges vary depending on the school. Public elementary and secondary schools are generally closed, but some school districts, such as New York City, may close for an entire week as a "mid-winter recess".

The holiday is also a tribute to the general who created the first military badge of merit for the common soldier. Revived on Washington's 200th birthday in 1932, the Purple Heart medal (which bears Washington's image) is awarded to soldiers who are injured in battle.

Community celebrations often display a lengthy heritage. Laredo, Texas, hosts a monthlong tribute, as does Washington's hometown of Alexandria, Virginia, which includes what is claimed to be the nation's longest-running and largest George Washington Birthday parade. Eustis, Florida, holds an annual "GeorgeFest" celebration that began in 1902, and in Denver, Colorado, there is a society dedicated to observing the day. At the George Washington Birthplace National Monument in Westmoreland County, Virginia, visitors are treated to birthday celebrations on the holiday, while at Mount Vernon they last throughout the holiday weekend and through February 22.

Since 1862 there has been a tradition in the United States Senate that George Washington's Farewell Address be read on his birthday. Citizens asked that this be done in light of the ongoing Civil War.

Punctuation
Because "Presidents' Day" is not the official name of the federal holiday, there is variation in how it is rendered, both colloquially and in the name of official state holidays.

When used with the intention of celebrating more than one individual, the form "Presidents' Day" was usual in the past. This is celebrating President Washington Day, President Fillmore Day, up to President Biden Day, individually. In recent years, as the use of attributive nouns (nouns acting as modifiers) has become more widespread, the form "Presidents Day" has become more common (It would mean celebrating Presidents Washington through Biden Day collectively); the Associated Press Stylebook, most newspapers and some magazines use this form.

"President's Day" as an alternate rendering of any one particular president, or for the purpose of commemorating the presidency as an institution, is a proper use of a possessive and is the legal rendering in eight states.

Dates

See also
 List of memorials to George Washington
 Family Day (Canada)
 Historical rankings of presidents of the United States

References

External links
 

1880 establishments in the United States
February observances
Monuments and memorials to George Washington in the United States
Public holidays in the United States
Recurring events established in 1880
Presidential birthdays in the United States
Holidays and observances by scheduling (nth weekday of the month)
Monday observances
Federal holidays in the United States
United States flag flying days